Sideritis scardica, commonly called Greek mountain tea, is flowering plant species native to Bulgaria, Greece, and Yugoslavia.

References

scardica